Marion Silva Fernandes, simply known as Marion (born 7 September 1991), is a Brazilian professional footballer who plays for Zob Ahan.

Career
Born in Teixeira de Freitas, Bahia, Marion graduated from Atlético Mineiro's youth system, and made his senior debut while on loan at Democrata FC. In January 2012 he was loaned to Vila Nova, in Série C. A year later he joined Betim, also in a temporary deal, with whom he appeared 16 times and netted six goals.

On 29 January 2014 Marion made his Galo debut, coming on as a substitute in a 0–0 draw at Minas Futebol. He scored his first goal on 9 March, netting the winner in a success at Guarani (MG).

Marion made his Série A debut on 20 April, again from the bench in a 0–0 home draw against Corinthians. He scored his first goal in the category on 11 May, netting his team's first in a 2–1 home win against fierce rivals Cruzeiro, and finished the campaign with 21 appearances.

On 12 February 2015 Marion was loaned to Al-Sharjah SCC, until June. At the end of his loan spell with the Emirati club, he immediately moved to Joinville EC, again in a temporary deal.

Honours
Atlético Mineiro
Recopa Sudamericana: 2014
Copa do Brasil: 2014

References

External links
Joinville official profile 

1991 births
Living people
Sportspeople from Bahia
Brazilian footballers
Association football forwards
Campeonato Brasileiro Série A players
Clube Atlético Mineiro players
Vila Nova Futebol Clube players
Ipatinga Futebol Clube players
Joinville Esporte Clube players
Sharjah FC players
Zob Ahan Esfahan F.C. players
Brazilian expatriate footballers
Brazilian expatriate sportspeople in the United Arab Emirates
UAE Pro League players